Moments and Memories: The Best of Reba is a compilation album by Reba McEntire, released on March 18, 1998 in Australia; June 1, 1998, in Europe; and September 21, 1999, in Canada, by MCA Nashville. The album features a different track listing in each country. It has been certified gold in Australia and Canada

Track listing

Australia

Europe

Canada

Charts 

Album

Singles

Certifications

References 

1999 greatest hits albums
Reba McEntire compilation albums
MCA Records compilation albums